Højbjerg is a postal district of Aarhus, Denmark.

Højbjerg originated as a coastal suburb to the south of Aarhus, but has now completely merged with the city. Højbjerg is located 5 km from the city centre and had a population of 22,000 in 2005.

Skåde, Holme and Fredensvang are neighbourhoods within and subdivisions of Højbjerg.

The historic manor of Moesgård and the related estate, including the Moesgård Museum and parts of the Marselisborg Forests are all situated in Højbjerg. IF Lyseng, one of Denmark's largest sports clubs in terms of membership, is also located in Højbjerg.

Gallery

See also 
Other postal districts of Aarhus includes:
 Viby J
 Brabrand
 Aarhus V
 Aarhus N
 Aarhus C

Sources 
 Børge Møller-Madsen, Billeder af Højbjergs historie. Aarhus Universitetsforlag 1997. . 
 Højbjerg Holme Lokalhistoriske Arkiv Archive on local history

External links 

Neighborhoods of Aarhus